The Indian rupee sign (₹) is the currency symbol for the Indian rupee (ISO 4217: INR), the official currency of India. Designed by D. Udaya Kumar, it was presented to the public by the Government of India on 15 July 2010, following its selection through an open competition among Indian residents. Before its adoption, the most commonly used symbols for the rupee were Rs, Re or, in texts in Indian languages, an appropriate abbreviation in the language used.

The design is based on the Devanagari letter "र" (ra) with a double horizontal line at the top and the Latin capital letter "R" without its vertical bar.

Other countries that use a rupee, such as Sri Lanka, Pakistan and Nepal, use the generic  character.

Origin 
On 5 March 2009, the Indian government announced a contest to create a sign for the Indian rupee. During the 2010 Union Budget, then Union Finance Minister Pranab Mukherjee said that the proposed sign should reflect and capture the Indian ethos and culture. From around 3,331 responses received, five symbols were shortlisted. These were the entries from Nondita Correa-Mehrotra, Hitesh Padmashali, Shibin KK, Shahrukh J. Irani, and D. Udaya Kumar: one of them was due to be selected at the Union Council of Ministers of India meeting held on 24 June 2010. However, the decision was deferred at the request of the Finance Minister, and the final decision was made when they met again on 15 July 2010, when they chose the symbol created by Udaya Kumar, Associate Professor IIT Guwahati.

Design 

The new sign is a combination of the Devanagari letter "र" ("ra") and the Latin capital letter "R" without its vertical bar. The parallel lines at the top (with white space between them) makes an allusion to the tricolour Indian flag and also depict an equality sign that symbolizes the nation's desire to reduce economic disparity.

The final selected symbol was designed by D. Udaya Kumar, a Bachelor of Architecture and (at the time) a visual design student at the Industrial Design Centre, IIT Bombay. The thoughts and philosophy behind the design are explained in this presentation.

Approval 
Ministry of Finance and Department of Economic Affairs of the Government of India had finally approved the sign. The approval was given by Sushil Kumar, Under Secretary of the Government of India in 2010.

Usage 

Upon the symbol's adoption in July 2010, the Indian government said it would try to adopt the sign within six months in the country and globally within 18 to 24 months.

Major banks have also started printing cheques with the new Indian rupee sign, where the traditional ₨ sign was used. The Indian Postal Department also started printing postage stamps with this new Indian rupee sign, when it issued the Commonwealth Games commemorative stamps on 3 October 2010. In his budget speech on 28 February 2011, the finance minister, Pranab Mukherjee, announced that the sign would be incorporated in future coin issues. Coins of denomination of 1, 2, 5 and 10 with the new rupee symbol have been put into circulation. As of January 2012, the new Indian rupee sign has been incorporated in the currency notes in the denominations of 10, 100, 500 and  1000 and as of 12 April 2012 this was extended to denominations of 20 and 50.

Unicode and keyboard entry

On 10 August 2010, the Unicode Technical Committee accepted the proposed code position . The character has been encoded in Unicode 6.0, and named distinctly from the existing character , which will continue to be available as the generic rupee sign.

Ubuntu became the first operating system to support the Indian rupee symbol by default in 2010. Since its 10.10 version it has supported the symbol out-of-the-box, as it was added to the Ubuntu font family by a contributor. Since then, it has been included in various Linux distributions. On systems running Ubuntu, most other Linux distributions and ChromeOS, the symbol may be typed using  (or simply  if the 'English (India)' language setting is used).

On 18 May 2011, Microsoft released an update KB2496898 to Windows Vista, Windows Server 2008, Windows 7 and Windows Server 2008 R2 operating systems to include support for this new Indian rupee symbol. With the Windows update, it is now possible to use alt code text entry to obtain the Indian Rupee symbol:   +. On systems running Windows 8 or later, the symbol can be typed using the 'English (India)' keyboard layout with the key combination + 
(or ++ or ++). Modern keyboards for the Indian market have the symbol engraved on the  key as an alternate graphic.

Apple Inc. has added support for the rupee symbol with iOS 7 in 2013. Mac OS X Lion (10.7) also includes the new Indian rupee symbol, which can be found in the Character Viewer. As of Mac OS X Mountain Lion (10.8), users using the Devanagari keyboard can enter the new Indian rupee symbol by typing - (a combination that yields the cent symbol on a US keyboard layout).

Sailfish OS also provides the symbol in its default keyboard.

Symbol for Paisa 

A symbol for the paisa was also designed using the same concept as the symbol for rupee. However, since paisa coins are no longer minted and, as of 2019 most denominations of the paisa have been demonetized, they are not in circulation. As the RBI had already stopped minting any paisa coins before this proposal, the proposed symbol never appeared on any coins. It does not have a codepoint in Unicode.

Controversy 
The Indian rupee sign selection process was challenged in the Delhi High Court, by petitioner Rakesh Kumar, who was a participant in the competition, described the process as "full of discrepancies" and "flawed", and named the Finance Ministry and the chairman of Indian Rupee Symbol Selection Committee as respondents. On 26 November 2010, the Delhi High Court single bench dismissed the writ petition, stating there was no justifiable ground for the stated allegations.

However, later the Delhi High Court, on 30 January 2013, in W.P. (c) 2449/2012 titled Rakesh Kumar Singh Vs. Union of India (PIL) and listed before the Division bench of the Chief Justice and Mr. Justice V. K. Jain, taking cognizance of and in view of the irregularities and arbitrariness involved in public competitions for designing symbols or logos or designing logos by other methods of important national bodies or institutions, in their judgment directed all the ministries of the Government of India to formulate or prepare guidelines to ensure transparency, wider participation of public and also that such guidelines should be of uniform nature and in uniformity with each others.

On 11 April 2013, the Finance Ministry formed the guidelines for conducting public competitions for design of symbol or logo.

See also
 Currency symbol

References

External links

 Udaya Kumar's design proposal for the Indian rupee sign
 Official announcement of the sign
 WebRupee ₹ Drupal Project
 rupyaINR, guidance for use of the Indian Rupee Symbol on the web

Currency symbols
Symbols introduced in 2012